Legible London is a citywide wayfinding system for London, operated by Transport for London (TfL). The system is designed to provide a consistent visual language and wayfinding system across the city, allowing visitors and local residents to easily gain local geographic knowledge regardless of the area they are in. It is the world's largest municipal wayfinding system.

In addition to the on-street signs, Legible London maps appear in all London Underground (Tube) stations, Docklands Light Railway stations, and on bus shelters, as well as on Barclays Cycle Hire docking stations and the Barclays Cycle Superhighways commuter cycle routes.

Design

The Legible London system comprises three sizes of sign, the "Monolith", "Midilith", and "Minilith", made of a mixture of vitreous enamel and vinyl printed glass materials within a stainless steel frame. The signs have a bright yellow stripe on top of the panels with the walking person icon, intended to make them easier to spot within the urban environment and when viewed from a distance.

Two maps, a "planner map" and a "finder map", are displayed on the majority of signs, one per side. In some cases the signs are one-sided due to the constraints of their placement. Both planner and finder maps show "walking circles" to place the user in the context of his or her surroundings.

The maps are illustrated in 2D with significant landmarks shown in 3D, helping users to identify the urban environment. For the same reason the maps are oriented in the direction that the reader is facing, rather than with north at the top.

TfL is currently developing prototype digital signs for Legible London, with a static map on one side and an interactive touchscreen display on the other.

History
In 2004, the then Mayor of London, Ken Livingstone declared that he would make London a walkable city by 2015. Subsequently, a project manager from the London Borough of Camden, as part of the Clear Zone Partnership, was sent to a walking conference in Bristol to study the Bristol Legible City signage system. He then championed a London version of the Bristol Legible City signs to the Central London Partnership. The London Borough of Camden with Westminster City Council and the City of London were also part of the Clear Zone Partnership which commissioned the consultants Space Syntax to produce a walking strategy to identify walking routes and new signage points in central london. The project manager then identified the best practice design principles for these new signs from Bristol Legible City and similar signage systems in the London Borough of Islington and the City of London. This was the start of the London Borough Camden's work by the project manager to improve street furniture in London which continued with the Camden bench.

The Central London Partnership organisation, representing central London government and businesses, commissioned the design consultancies AIG London (now Applied Wayfinding) and Lacock Gullam to research London's walking environments. The research resulted in a study, published in January 2006, that proposed the idea of a "Legible London".

The authors of the report found that there were 32 different wayfinding systems in central London alone, implemented by various local institutions such as boroughs and councils. The inconsistency between the systems was a source visual incoherency and confusion throughout the city for pedestrians, leading to a sense of insecurity that undermined the city's potential for retail and tourism.

The report also noted that although many Tube stations were quicker to walk than use a train to travel between, many visitors were unaware of this, and subsequently causing avoidable congestion on the Tube. Similarly, not knowing the local geography caused many pedestrians and travellers to use the tube map when navigating, with over 40% of the city's travellers using the Tube map even when navigating on foot.

Local area studies were undertaken in Westminster, South Bank, Richmond and Twickenham to show how the concept could adapt to different urban forms, with a further study in Hackney looking at specific issues relating to transport interchange. An exhibition at New London Architecture was held to promote the idea and lobby for its adoption.

The London Borough of Camden began a funding bid for Legible London signs, however Transport for London decided that Westminster would be a better test location. A prototype was commissioned by Westminster City Council, the Greater London Authority through TfL, New West End Company and the Crown Estate, comprising 19 signs installed around Oxford Street and Bond Street along with new customised maps and information panels.

Following a successful reception of the prototype and research results the project was formally adopted by TfL for further development and evaluation in collaboration with the design agencies. Three pilot schemes were commissioned in Westminster/Camden, South Bank, and Richmond and Twickenham to demonstrate how the system could be applied and work for different urban forms and travel demands, and further test the signs' design, mapping scales and information content. A fourth pilot was commissioned by Westminster City Council for the West End. A survey following the pilot schemes showed an extremely high degree of support among members of the public.

Outside London
 Legible London-style monoliths and fingerposts have also been introduced on streets and canals in Stoke-on-Trent

Awards
 Gold Medal, Design for Society section, Design Business Association Design Effectiveness Awards, 2008 
 Ordnance Survey MasterMap Award for Better Mapping, British Cartographic Society, 2009 
 Honor Award, Society for Experiential Graphic Design, 2010

References

External links
 
 "Legible London: Can better signs help people understand an extremely disorienting city?" in Slate. 4 March 2010.
 Bristol Legible City
 Applied Wayfinding
 Lacock Gullam
 Home - Applied Wayfinding
 Legible London 10th anniversary
 The making of the Legible London basemap

Walking in London
Infrastructure in London